John Haynes Jr. (born March 7, 1937) is a rural family physician and surgeon, and community leader of Northwest Louisiana and Northeast Texas. Haynes is known for being chosen as the first Country Doctor of the Year in 1993 in recognition of his outstanding contributions to rural health care. Dr. Haynes died June 7, 2021 after a long battle with cardiovascular disease.

Johnny, or "Doc" as referred to by those closest to him, worked at his father's service station as a youngster. He was an All-State High School Basketball Player in Atlanta, TX.

Haynes received his Bachelor of Science from Centenary College, his Medical Degree from University of Texas Medical Branch School in Galveston, and completed his internship and residency at John Peter Smith Hospital in Fort Worth, Texas. He became the Chief of Staff at North Caddo Memorial Hospital in Vivian, LA in 1966. He later became a founding member of the American Board of Family Medicine. In 1993 he founded the Rural Family Practice Fellowship and residency in conjunction with Willis-Knighton Health System and Louisiana State University Medical Center School of Medicine in Shreveport, LA. He was on the faculty of Family Medicine at LSU Medical School in Shreveport. Dr. Haynes taught many medical students, residents, nurses and health professionals throughout the years.

In 1966, he began his medical practice in Vivian, Louisiana, and became Chief of Staff at North Caddo Memorial Hospital where he was a catalyst and leader for quality healthcare for the region for over 50 years. He was known for his drive and passion for full service rural healthcare and his compassionate, patient-centered bedside manner. Dr. Haynes was a courageous, caring country doctor who healed and saved the lives of thousands of patients. He touched the lives of so many families with kindness and dedication - a true doctor of the body and soul.

Haynes was also honored as the Louisiana Family Practitioner of the Year in 1998 and 2004 and the Louisiana Rural Practitioner of the Year award in 1998 and 2009. He is the author of several publications including "Laparoscopic cholecystectomy in a Rural Family Practice: The Vivian, LA Experience" in the Journal of Family Practice 2004. Haynes has trained thousands of medical students and physician residents in the field of rural family medicine.

When he was not practicing medicine, Doc was hunting, fishing, or skeet shooting. He was an avid sportsman and an Olympic Skeet Shooting Champion. He loved spending time with family and friends, early mornings in the duck blinds, squirrel hunting and quail hunting with his bird dogs. He was a very spiritual man who loved God and lived by Browning's quote, "Ah, but a man's reach should exceed his grasp, or what's a heaven for?"

Dr. Haynes was an amazing father, grandfather and great-grandfather who loved his family more than anything. He was the Haynes family's guiding light. His departure was a tremendous loss to patients, students, colleagues, friends, family, & his community.

A USA Today article from 1993 described Haynes as "a cross between Marcus Welby and John Wayne."

References 

1937 births
Living people
American primary care physicians
Centenary College of Louisiana alumni
University of Texas Medical Branch alumni